() is an apostolic constitution issued by Pope John Paul II regarding Catholic colleges and universities. Promulgated on 15 August 1990 and intended to become effective in the academic year starting in 1991, its aim was to define and refine the Catholicism of Catholic institutions of higher education.

Institutions newly claiming to be Catholic would require affirmation from "the Holy See, by an Episcopal Conference or another Assembly of Catholic hierarchy, or by a diocesan bishop". Institutions currently claiming to be Catholic are considered Catholic, unless declared otherwise by the same. The document cites canon 810 of the 1983 Code of Canon Law, which instructs Catholic educational facilities to respect norms established by local bishops. Ex corde underscores the authority of bishops and mentions that canon law (canon 812) requires all teachers of theology, in Catholic colleges and universities, to have the mandate of the local ecclesiastical authority (normally the local bishop).

The apostolic constitution was viewed as a rebuttal to the Land O'Lakes Statement, a 1967 position paper adopted by the participants of a seminar sponsored by University of Notre Dame on the role of Catholic universities. Attendees at this American seminar included the presidents of the following universities: the University of Notre Dame, Georgetown, Seton Hall, Boston College, Fordham, St. Louis University, and the Pontifical Catholic University of Puerto Rico. Over a dozen other educators from North American Catholic institutions of higher education were also present.

Content
 Introduction
 Part 1 - Identity and Mission
 Part 2 - General Norms
 Transitional Norms
 Conclusion

Role of theology

 "Theology plays a particularly important role in the search for a synthesis of knowledge as well as in the dialogue between faith and reason. It serves all other disciplines in their search for meaning...Because of its specific importance among the academic disciplines, every Catholic University should have a faculty, or at least a chair, of theology" (Ex Corde Ecclesiae §19)

See also
 Gravissimum educationis

References

External links
[https://www.vatican.va/content/john-paul-ii/en/apost_constitutions/documents/hf_jp-ii_apc_15081990_ex-corde-ecclesiae.html] English text at www.vatican.va''

1990 documents
1990 in Christianity
Apostolic constitutions of Pope John Paul II
Catholic education